William Cecil may refer to:

 Lord William Cecil (courtier) (1854–1943), British royal courtier
 Lord William Cecil (bishop) (1863–1936), Bishop of Exeter, 1916–1936
 William Cecil, 1st Baron Burghley (1520–1598), English politician and advisor to Elizabeth I
 William Cecil, 2nd Earl of Exeter (1566–1640), Knight of the Garter
 William Cecil, 2nd Earl of Salisbury (1591–1668), Knight of the Garter
 William Cecil, 3rd Marquess of Exeter (1825–1895), member of the Privy Council of the United Kingdom
 William Cecil, 5th Marquess of Exeter (1876–1956), recipient of the Territorial Decoration
 William Cecil, 7th Marquess of Exeter (1909–1988), son of William Cecil, 5th Marquess of Exeter
 William Cecil, 17th Baron de Ros (1590–1618), Baron in the Peerage of England

 William Amherst Vanderbilt Cecil (1928–2017), operator of the Biltmore Estate
 William Cecil Ross (1911–1998), politician in Manitoba, Canada
 William Cecil Slingsby (1849–1929), English mountain climber and alpine explorer